Aghol Beyk-e Sofla (also Romanized as Āghol Beyk-e Soflá; also known as Aghalbak, Aqalbak Pāin, Ash Oghulbeyn, Ogholbeyg, Oghol Beyg-e Pā’īn, Owghlī Beyg-e Soflá, and Owghol Beyg-e Pā’īn) is a village in Ijrud-e Bala Rural District of the Central District of Ijrud County, Zanjan province, Iran. At the 2006 National Census, its population was 930 in 229 households. The following census in 2011 counted 1,101 people in 286 households. The latest census in 2016 showed a population of 1,155 people in 335 households; it was the largest village in its rural district.

References 

Ijrud County

Populated places in Zanjan Province

Populated places in Ijrud County